The Bucket Fountain is an iconic kinetic sculpture in Wellington, the capital city of New Zealand. It is located in Cuba Mall, which is part of Cuba Street. It consists of a series of "buckets" that fill with water until they tip, spilling their load into the buckets and pool below. The fountain was designed by Graham Allardice of Burren and Keen and erected in 1969.

It is very similar to a fountain erected in Liverpool in 1967 designed by Richard Huws.
 
Much of the water does not reach the buckets below, but instead splashes onto pedestrians and onlookers. On windy days (common in Wellington) water is carried several metres from the fountain.

People often add dishwashing detergent to the water, which spreads bubbles all over the mall. This is common on Friday and Saturday nights.

Wellington City Council upgraded the fountain in 2003, and some buckets were turned around so they intentionally tip their water onto the pavement.

Incidents
Elijah Wood, who played Frodo in Peter Jackson's The Lord of the Rings films, climbed on and drunkenly urinated in the fountain while in New Zealand filming the movies. This was confirmed by the actor during an interview with Jay Leno.

In March 2006, the fountain was coated in a mud-like substance by New Zealand artist John Radford.

In January 2014 the bucket fountain was victim of a simulated oil spill with the water turned black.  The protest was "to illustrate the threat which deep sea drilling poses to Wellington coasts, local businesses, the environment and the people."

In February 2016, one of the larger yellow buckets located near the bottom of the fountain was stolen in the night. After a plea by the Wellington City Council to have the bucket returned, the missing bucket was left in the pool at the base of the fountain. The returned bucket was found to have been painted with an intricate and psychedelic pattern. On 17 March, the bucket was reinstalled on the fountain. Wellington Mayor Celia Wade-Brown, when approached on the issue, said "I'm unequivocally blissful they brought it back unscathed and apparently enhanced, from what I’ve seen. We consider it an utterly appealing small paint job."

In October 2021 one of the larger buckets was reported stolen from the fountain. It was retrieved in December 2021 after a member of the public spotted a picture of the bucket on social media and reported it to the Wellington City Council. The thief had painted the bucket gold and drawn a dragon on it. By the time the bucket was found the Council was in the process of creating a replacement bucket which would cost $2000.

In Popular Culture

The fountain appeared in the first episode of television show Wellington Paranormal in which lead characters Minogue and O'Leary perform an exorcism on the fountain.

References

External links

Unofficial website

In The Night Kitchen – Documentary

Buildings and structures in Wellington City
Fountains in New Zealand
Kinetic sculptures
Outdoor sculptures in New Zealand
Tourist attractions in Wellington City